SS Teviotbank was a Bank Line cargo ship launched in 1938. She was requisitioned by the Royal Navy for conversion to the auxiliary minelayer HMS Teviotbank. She was one of the first merchant ships (and the slowest) converted for this purpose during World War II. She served in home waters until transferred to the Eastern Fleet in 1941. She then served briefly in the Mediterranean before being returned to the Bank Line (Andrew Weir Shipping & Trading Co. Ltd) in 1944.

Notes

References
 
 

Minelayers of the Royal Navy
1937 ships
World War II minelayers of the United Kingdom